This is a list of towns and settlements in Anambra State, Nigeria organised by local government area (LGA) and district/area (with postal codes also given).

By postal code

References

List of villages in ANAMBRA WEST : EZIANAM : OROMA , UMUEM, UMUEZE ,

Anambra